Maher Zain (born 16 July 1981) is a Lebanese-Swedish R&B singer, songwriter and music producer. He released his debut album Thank You Allah, an internationally successful album produced by Awakening Records, in 2009. He released his follow-up album Forgive Me in April 2012 under the same production company, and a third album One in 2016.

Career

Beginnings
Maher Zain's Lebanese family emigrated to Sweden when he was eight. He completed his schooling there, gaining a bachelor's degree in Aeronautical Engineering. After university, he entered the music industry in Sweden, and in 2005 linked up with the Moroccan-born Swedish producer RedOne. When RedOne moved to New York in 2006, Zain soon followed to continue his music industry career in the United States, producing for artists such as Kat DeLuna.

On returning home to Sweden, he became engaged once more with his Islamic faith and decided to move away from a career as a music producer to become a singer/songwriter of contemporary R&B music with a strong Muslim religious influence.

Breakthrough and success
In January 2009, Maher Zain began working on an album with Awakening Records. His debut album, Thank You Allah, with 13 songs and two bonus tracks, was released on 1 November 2009 with percussion versions and French versions of some tracks released shortly afterwards.

Zain and Awakening Records successfully used social media such as Facebook, YouTube and iTunes to promote tracks from the album. In early 2010 his music very quickly gathered a huge online following in Arabic-speaking and Islamic countries as well as among young Muslims in western countries. By the end of 2010, he was the most Googled celebrity in Malaysia for that year. Malaysia and Indonesia have been the countries where he has had the most commercial success. The album Thank You Allah has been certified multiple platinum by Warner Music Malaysia and Sony Music Indonesia. It became the highest selling album of 2010 in Malaysia.

Zain sings mainly in English but has released some of his most popular songs in other languages.  The song  "Insha Allah", for example, is now available in English, French, Arabic, Turkish, Malay and Indonesian versions. Another song, "Allahi Allah Kiya Karo" ("Continuously Saying Allah"), is sung in Urdu and features the Pakistan born Canadian singer Irfan Makki. Zain has performed concerts around the world, including in the UK, the United States, Malaysia, Indonesia, Saudi Arabia and Egypt. He has fan clubs in several countries including Malaysia, Egypt, and Morocco. He took part in the judging committee of the Awakening Talent Contest to choose Awakening Records' new star in 2013.

Collaborations, appearances and awards

In January 2010, Maher Zain won Best Religious Song for 'Ya Nabi Salam Alayka', on Nogoum FM, a major Middle East mainstream music station, beating other prominent singers including Hussein Al-Jismi, Mohammed Mounir and Sami Yusuf.

In March 2011, Maher Zain released "Freedom", a song inspired by the events and the actions of the people taking part in the Arab Spring.

Maher Zain was chosen as a Muslim Star of 2011 in a competition organized by Onislam.net. In July 2011 he featured on the cover of the UK Muslim lifestyle magazine Emel.

Zain was featured on Irfan Makki's track "I Believe" from his debut studio album of the same name.

Maher Zain has appeared in the 40-episode Indonesian TV drama Insya-Allah. The show was aired on Malaysian satellite TV channel, Astro Oasis and Mustika HD, starting 17 July 2012, concurrent with the broadcasting of the show on Indonesia's SCTV.

In 2013, he took part in the Colors of Peace project constituting songs based on works by Fethullah Gülen on the album Rise Up where Maher Zain performs the track "This Worldly Life".

Discography

Albums

Compilations

Mini albums

Singles 

 Palestine Will Be Free  2009
 Insha Allah  2010
 The Chosen One 
 Freedom 2011
 Ya Nabi Salam Alayka 
 For The Rest Of My Life 
 Samih 2014
 Nas Teshbehlena
 A'amarona A'amalona2015
 Eidun Mubarak 2022

Videography

2009: Palestine Will Be Free
2009: Subhan Allah
2010: Insha Allah
2010: The Chosen One
2011: Freedom
2011: Ya Nabi Salam Alayka
2011: For the Rest of My Life
2012: Number One For Me
2012: So Soon
2012: Guide Me All the Way
2013: Love Will Prevail
2013: Ramadan
2014: Muhammad (P.B.U.H)
2014: Nas Teshbehlana (in Arabic ناس تشبهلنا) 
2014: One Day
2015: A'maroona A'maloona (in Arabic أعمارنا أعمالنا)
2016: I am Alive (with Atif Aslam)
2016: By my Side
2016: Paradise
2016: Peace Be Upon You
2016: The Way of Love (with Mustafa Ceceli)
2017: Close to You
2017: As-subhu Bada (in Arabic الصبح بدا)
2017: Kun Rahma (in Arabic كن رحمة)
2017: Medina
2018: Huwa AlQuran
2019: Ala Nahjik Mashayt
2019: Live It Up (feat. Lenny Martinez)
2019: Ummi
2020: Antassalam
2020: Asma Allah Alhusna (The 99 Names of Allah)
2020: Break The Chains
2020: Srebrenica

Featured in
2011: I Believe (Irfan Makki feat. Maher Zain) (in Irfan Makki's album I Believe)
2009 : Never Forget (Mesut Kurtis feat. Maher Zain) (in Mesut Kurtis' album Beloved)
2014: So Real (Raef feat. Maher Zain) (in Raef's album The Path)
2014: Eidun Saeed (Mesut Kurtis feat. Maher Zain) (in Mesut Kurtis' album Tabassam)

Philanthropic activities
In 2013, Zain performed in Canada on a tour organised by Islamic Relief to raise donations for typhoon victims in the Philippines. Zain took part in the UK "Sound of Light" event organized by Human Appeal International in support of the Syrian people. Zain also dedicated his song "Love will prevail" (sung in Arabic and English) to the Syrians.
 Zain celebrated his birthday with his 3.9 million Facebook fans by asking them to donate money to a United States–based charity organization that builds water wells in Africa. His fans paid more than $15,000 within a few weeks.
Zain took part in a London pro-Palestinian rally, joined by thousands of people, to call for the end to Israeli military action in Gaza. In August 2014, Zain took part in "The Great Wall of China Trek 2014" a 10-day humanitarian mission in association with Human Appeal to raise donations for clean water to children in Gaza.
Ahead of performing at the 2014 Nansen Refugee Award Ceremony, Zain travelled to Lebanon with UNHCR to spend time with Syrian refugees and see UNHCR's frontline work. Zain sang "One Day" about refugees in Geneva's Bâtiment des Forces Motrices for the award ceremony.

References

External links

1981 births
Living people
Lebanese Sunni Muslims
Swedish Muslims
Swedish Sunni Muslims
Lebanese emigrants to Sweden
21st-century Lebanese male singers
Lebanese songwriters
Swedish male singer-songwriters
Performers of Islamic music
Awakening Music artists
Naturalized citizens of Sweden
21st-century Swedish male singers
Rotana Records artists
Singers who perform in Egyptian Arabic
Singers who perform in Classical Arabic
People from Tripoli, Lebanon